Belmont Rural is a civil parish in Herefordshire, England. The population of the Civil Parish taken at the 2011 Census was 3,769.  It is south-west of Hereford. The name Belmont Rural was chosen because it is separate from the City of Hereford and borders open countryside on its Western boundary and has the River Wye as its Northern boundary. Belmont Rural Parish was formed 20 years ago and includes 1800 modern houses and a considerable amount of public open space. The Parish is fortunate to have two Community Centres, one of which houses a small public library. It also hosts a medium-sized Tesco Store and the Three Counties Hotel, which are the only businesses of any size in the community. It also has a Medical Centre and an adjacent Pharmacy.

Belmont Rural is essentially a dormitory parish. Its residents work elsewhere or are retired. Belmont Rural does not have any schools. Generally it is a very relaxing and attractive place to live, except in the "rush" hours when the main artery the A465 is jammed with stationary traffic.

References

External links
Belmont Rural Parish Council http://www.belmontrural-pc.gov.ukl

Civil parishes in Herefordshire